The European Union-wide banking stress test 2016 was conducted by the European Banking Authority (EBA) in order to assess the resilience of financial institutions in the European Union to a hypothetical adverse market scenario. The stress test was formally launched on 24 February 2016 with a publication of the final methodology and templates as well as the scenarios. It covered over 70% of the national banking-industry assets in the euro area, each EU member state and Norway. 53 EU banks participated in the exercise, 39 of which fall under the jurisdiction of the Single Supervisory Mechanism (SSM). The outcomes of the exercise, including banks' individual results, were published on 29 July 2016, at 22:00 CET.

Background
The European Banking Authority (EBA) aims to ensure the proper functioning of financial markets and the stability of the financial system in the EU. To this end, the EBA has the right to conduct the EU-wide stress tests, in cooperation with the European Systemic Risk Board (ESRB). Such exercises are designed to test the resilience of financial institutions to adverse market developments.

The stress tests are performed in cooperation with the ESRB, the European Central Bank (ECB), national competent authorities and the European Commission. In particular, the EBA was responsible for the common methodology and disclosure of the results. The ESRB and the European Commission designed the underlying macroeconomic scenarios. The quality assurance process of banks’ results was led by the ECB and national competent authorities. Moreover, the ECB conducted the Asset Quality Review that served as a starting point of the stress test.

Features of the stress test
Banks needed to assess the impact of a macroeconomic baseline and adverse scenario. The scenarios each covered a period of three years (2015-2018). The macroeconomic adverse scenario and any risk type specific shocks linked to the scenario are developed by the ESRB and the ECB in close cooperation with competent authorities, the EBA and the European Commission. The latter will also provide the macroeconomic baseline scenario.

Risk types considered in the stress test included credit risk including securitisations, market risk and counterparty credit risk, operational risk including conduct risk. In addition, banks are requested to project the effect of the scenarios on net interest income and to stress P&L and capital items not covered by other risk types. The 2016 exercise adds an explicit treatment of conduct risk and FX lending to its scope.

The stress test relied on a static balance sheet assumption as of 31 December 2015, implying no new growth and a constant business mix and model over the whole time horizon.methodology

The exercise is run at the highest level of consolidation. The scope of consolidation is the perimeter of the banking group as defined by the CRR/CRD IV (i.e. the implementation of Basel III in the EU). Insurance activities are therefore excluded both from the balance sheet and the revenues and costs side of the P&L.

As opposed to the 2014 stress test, no single capital threshold is defined for this exercise as banks will be assessed against relevant supervisory capital ratios under a static balance sheet and the results will inform the 2016 round of Supervisory Review and Evaluation Processes (SREP) under which decisions are made on appropriate capital resources and forward looking capital plans are challenged. No hurdle rates or capital thresholds are defined for the purpose of the exercise. However, competent authorities will apply stress test results as an input to the supervisory review and evaluation process.

Results
No bank will be said to have failed because the test won't judge banks against a single capital threshold as in previous exercises.

The outcomes of the exercise, including banks' individual results, was published on 29 July 2016. An expedited publication is designed to align the finalisation of the exercise with the cycle of the annual supervisory review and evaluation process (SREP), as this will ensure the results of the stress test are incorporated as an input to that process. DZ Bank was excluded from the test due to the ongoing merger with WGZ Bank, as well as National Bank of Greece was already covered in 2015 Comprehensive Assessment of European Central Bank.

The following table lists the  banks that undergone the stress test:

References

External links

 European Banking Authority: 2016 EU-wide stress testing

Stress tests (financial)
2016 in the European Union
Banking in the European Union
2016 in economics